The Royal Fremantle Open was an Australian golf tournament. The event was held at Royal Fremantle Golf Club in Fremantle, Western Australia.

History 
Western Australian Terry Gale had much success at the event, winning it in 1979 and finishing runner-up two years later. The professional Ray Hore also had much success at the event, posting one win and two runner-ups.

Among the most notable performances was in 1981. Royal Fremantle amateur Glenn Carbon, playing at a 2 handicap, holed a 50 metre pitch at the last for an eagle to defeat Terry Gale by a stroke.

Winners

References

Golf tournaments in Australia
Golf in Western Australia
Sport in Fremantle
Recurring sporting events established in 1977
Recurring sporting events disestablished in 1982
1976 establishments in Australia
1982 disestablishments in Australia